In Pakistan, a tehsil is an administrative sub-division of a District. Those are sub-divided into union councils. Here is a list of all the tehsils of Balochistan Province.

Loralai division

Loralai District 

 Bori Tehsil
 Mekhtar Tehsil

Duki District 

 Duki Tehsil

Musakhel District 

 Darug Tehsil
 Kingri Tehsil
 Musakhel Tehsil
 Toisar Tehsil

Kalat Division

Awaran District

 Awaran Tehsil
 Gishkaur Tehsil
 Jhal Jhao Tehsil
 Korak Jahoo Tehsil
 Mashkay Tehsil

Kalat District

 Kalat Tehsil
 Mangochar Tehsil
 Surab Tehsil
 Gazg Tehsil
 Johan Tehsil

Kharan District

 Kharan Tehsil
 Sar-Kharan Tehsil
 Tohumulk Tehsil

Khuzdar District

 Khuzdar Tehsil
 Nall, Pakistan
 Wadh
 Zehri Tehsil
 Baghbana Tehsil
 Aranji Tehsil
 Greshek Tehsil
 Karkh Tehsil
 Moola Tehsil
 Ornach Tehsil
 Saroona Tehsil

Lasbela District

 Hub Tehsil
 Dureji Tehsil
 Bela Tehsil
 Kanraj Tehsil
 Uthal Tehsil

Mastung District

 Dasht Tehsil
 Mastung Tehsil
 Khad Koocha Tehsil
 Kardigap Tehsil

Washuk District

 Besima Tehsil
 Mashkel Tehsil
 Washuk Tehsil
 Nag Tehsil
 Shahgori Tehsil

Makran Division

Gwadar District

 Gwadar Tehsil
 Jiwani Tehsil
 Ormara Tehsil
 Pasni Tehsil
 Suntsar Tehsil

Kech District

 Mand Tehsil
 Tump Tehsil
 Turbat Tehsil
 Balnigor Tehsil
 Buleda Tehsil
 Dasht Tehsil
 Zamuran Tehsil
Gayab Tehsil 
Solband Tehsil

Panjgur District

 Gowargo Tehsil
 Panjgur Tehsil
 Paroom Tehsil
 Gichk Tehsil

Nasirabad Division

Jafarabad District

 Gandakha Tehsil
 Jhatpat Tehsil
 Usta Mohammad Tehsil

Jhal Magsi District

 Gandawa Tehsil
 Jhal Magsi Tehsil
 Mirpur Tehsil

Kachi District

 Dhadar Tehsil
 Balanari Tehsil
 Khattan Tehsil
 Mach Tehsil
 Sani Tehsil

Lehri District

 Bhag Tehsil
 Lehri Tehsil

Nasirabad District

 Baba Kot Tehsil
 Dera Murad Jamali Tehsil
 Tamboo Tehsil
 Chattar Tehsil

Sohbatpur District

 Faridabad Tehsil
 Hayrvi Tehsil
 Manjipur Tehsil
 Sohbatpur Tehsil

Quetta Division

Chagai District

 Dalbandin Tehsil
 Nokundi Tehsil
 Taftan Tehsil
 Chagai Tehsil

Killa Abdullah District

 Chaman Tehsil
 Gulistan Tehsil
 Killa Abdullah Tehsil
 Dobandi Tehsil

Nushki District

 Nushki Tehsil
 Dak Tehsil

Pishin District

 Hurramzai Tehsil
 Pishin Tehsil
 Saranan Tehsil

Karezat District
 Karezat Tehsil
 Barshore Tehsil

Quetta District

 Chiltan Tehsil
 Zarghoon Tehsil
 Panjpai Tehsil
 Sadar Tehsil
  Kuchlak
   Siryab

Sibi Division

Dera Bugti District

 Dera Bugti Tehsil
 Phelawagh Tehsil
 Sui Tehsil
 Baiker Tehsil

Harnai District

 Harnai Tehsil
 Shahrig Tehsil
 Khoast Tehsil

Kohlu District

 Kahan Tehsil
 Kohlu Tehsil
 Maiwand Tehsil
 Tamboo Tehsil
 Grisini Tehsil

Sibi District

 Sibi Tehsil
 Kutmandai Tehsil
 Sangan Tehsil

Ziarat District

 Ziarat Tehsil
 Sinjavi Tehsil

Zhob Division

Sherani District

 Sherani Tehsil

Zhob District

 Qamar Din Karez Tehsil
 Zhob Tehsil
 Ashwat Tehsil
 Kashatu Tehsil
 Sambaza Tehsil

Killa Saifullah District

 Killa Saifullah Tehsil
 Loiband Tehsil
 Muslim Bagh Tehsil
 Badini
 Kanmetharzai Tehsil
 Shinki Tehsil

Barkhan District

 Barkhan Tehsil

See also
 List of tehsils in Pakistan

Note
 Sub-Tehsils are listed in italics